The 2017 Heart of Dallas Bowl was an American college football bowl game played on December 26, 2017, at the Cotton Bowl in Dallas, Texas. It was one of the 2017–18 bowl games concluding the 2017 FBS football season. The 8th edition of the Heart of Dallas Bowl, it was sponsored by fast food chicken restaurant Zaxby's, and was officially known as the Zaxby's Heart of Dallas Bowl.

The game featured the Utah Utes from the Pac-12 Conference against the West Virginia Mountaineers from the Big 12 Conference. Utah defeated West Virginia, 30–14.

Team selection
The game featured conference tie-ins with teams from Conference USA and the Big 12 Conference.  However, the bowl instead invited a team from the Pac-12 Conference.  This was the second all-time meeting between the two schools, with the first occurring in the 1964 Liberty Bowl.  It was the first Heart of Dallas Bowl for each team.

Utah

West Virginia

Game summary

Scoring summary

Statistics

Media
The game was broadcast by ESPN, and kicked off at 1:30 PM ET.

References

External links
 Game summary at ESPN

2017–18 NCAA football bowl games
2017
2017
2017
2017 in sports in Texas
December 2017 sports events in the United States
2010s in Dallas
2017 in Texas